"Histoires de luv" is fourth single by French-Canadian rapper K.Maro, and the first single from his third studio album Million Dollar Boy. The song contains mix of French and English lyrics.

Track listings
 CD single
 "Histoires de luv" — 3:47
 "Strip Club" — 4:19

 12" maxi
 "Histoires de luv" — 3:47
 "Million Dollar Boy"

Charts

Weekly charts

Year-end charts

Certifications

References

External links
 Song information

2005 songs
2006 singles
K.Maro songs
Franglais songs